Edmund Vincent O'Brien (4 May 1883 – 30 January 1934) was an Australian rules footballer who played with St Kilda in the Victorian Football League (VFL).

Notes

External links 

1883 births
1934 deaths
Australian rules footballers from Victoria (Australia)
St Kilda Football Club players